Emily Miranda Hamilton (née Beevers; born 24 May 1971) is a British actress.

Career
Hamilton's notable roles include:
The Queen … Princess Diana; 2009
The Bill … Dr. Julia Bickham:
"Reaching Out" (#25.50); 20 August 2009, ITV1
"Psychiatric Help" (#25.49); 13 August 2009, ITV1
"Line of Fire: Part 2" (#23.78); 24 October 2007, ITV1
"Line of Fire: Part 1" (#23.77); 18 October 2007, ITV1
Midsomer Murders … Leonie Charteris in "They Seek Him Here"; 27 April 2008, ITV1
The Memsahib … Grace; 2006
Making Waves … Lt. Cdr. Jenny Howard; 2004
He Died with a Felafel in His Hand … Sam; 2001
David Copperfield … Agnes Wickfield; 2000
The Grand … Christina Lloyd-Price; 1998
The Ruby Ring … Lucy; 1997
Holding On … Tina; 1997
Catherine Cookson's The Girl … Margaret Thornton; 1996
The Ruth Rendell Mysteries ... Sophie Riding; 1996
The Buccaneers … Lady Georgina; 1995
Wycliffe ... Jean Lander; 1994

Personal life
Emily Hamilton was born Emily Miranda Beevers in Hammersmith, London and grew up with her mother in Ealing, west London, where she attended Notting Hill & Ealing High School GDST. While at school, she appeared in a regular photo story for teen magazine 'Jackie'. She was originally planning to study at St Andrew's University, but after achieving better-than-expected A'Level results, she took a year out and re-applied to Wadham College, University of Oxford, where she won a place to study English Literature. Married since September 2001, Hamilton's husband is the actor Tristan Gemmill, best known for playing Adam Trueman in BBC One's long-running medical drama series Casualty. The couple have a son and a daughter together.

References

External links
 

1971 births
Living people
British film actresses
British television actresses
Alumni of Wadham College, Oxford
Actresses from London
People from Hammersmith
20th-century British actresses
21st-century British actresses
People educated at Notting Hill & Ealing High School
20th-century English women
20th-century English people
21st-century English women
21st-century English people